Stans is a municipality in the Schwaz district in the Austrian state of Tyrol. It is located in the Inn valley, some 3 km away from Schwaz.

References

Gallery

Cities and towns in Schwaz District